Uttar Pradesh Tourism (commonly referred to as Uttar Pradesh Tourism Department or UP Tourism Department) is a state government agency which is responsible for promotion of tourism in the Indian state of Uttar Pradesh. The department is also responsible for drafting and implementation of the tourism policy, including heritage, air service, and eco-tourism policies for Uttar Pradesh.

History 
To promote tourism, the Directorate of Tourism was established in the 1972 with a Director/Director General who is an IAS officer. In 1974 the Uttar Pradesh State Tourism Development Corporation was established to look after the commercial tourist activities. The organisation is now simply known as "Uttar Pradesh Tourism".

To boost the tourism in the state from within the country and other parts of the world, the Government of Uttar Pradesh established an Uttar Pradesh Heritage Arc covering the cities of Ayodhya, Mathura, Vrindavan, Agra, Mirzapur, Lucknow and Varanasi and organised "Uttar Pradesh Travel Mart" in 2015 in Lucknow. The event was attended by 80 delegates from 27 countries.

Organisation 
Uttar Pradesh Tourism is headed by Director-general or Director and is under the purview of the Department of Tourism, Uttar Pradesh. Reporting to the DG or Director, are the Regional Offices which is represented by the Regional Tourist Officers (R.T.O). Uttar Pradesh Tourism has offices all over India and has overseas representation in Australia, Canada, France, Germany, Italy, Japan, Netherlands, Singapore, South Africa, United Arab Emirates, United Kingdom and in the United States.

2015 Tourism policy 
The Uttar Pradesh Government has drafted a new tourism policy in 2015 with following key objectives.
 To identify and develop new tourism products.
 Development of new tourism circuits and development of old circuits.
 Expansion and improvement of existing tourism infrastructure.
 Creation of infrastructure on tourist places.
 Development of alternative tourism.
 Improvement of quality of tourism products in the state.
 To improve and preserve the art and culture of the state.
 To create awareness and sensitivity about tourism in general public.
 Public–private partnership in the field of tourism.
 To make UP tourism a memorable experience for the tourists.
 To make inter-state travel easier by modernising transportation.

See also 
 Tourism in Uttar Pradesh
 Ministry of Tourism (India)

References 

1974 establishments in Uttar Pradesh
Government agencies established in 1974
Tourism in Uttar Pradesh
State agencies of Uttar Pradesh
Tourism agencies